Sick Puppies EP is the fourth EP by Australia rock band Sick Puppies. The EP was sold at live events and is now only available on the secondhand market. The EP was released as an enhanced CD with bonus multimedia content featuring lyrics, a photo gallery, the YouTube Free Hugs video for "All the Same", and a live video trailer. All the tracks were re-released on the album Dressed Up As Life.

Track listing

Personnel
Credits for Sick Puppies EP adapted from liner notes.
Sick Puppies
 Shim Moore – lead vocals, lead guitar
 Emma Anzai – bass, backing vocals
 Mark Goodwin – drums

Production
 Tim James – producer, mixing
 Antonina Armato – producer
 Paul Palmer – A&R, mixing
 Dorian Crozier – engineer
 Nigel Lundemo – engineer, assistant
 Paul Stepanek – management

Artwork
 Asphyxia – cover artwork
 Nigel Skeet – photography

Charts

References

Sick Puppies albums
2006 EPs